Frederick (Fred, Skip) Goodman is Professor of Education Emeritus at the University of Michigan School of Education, Ann Arbor. He created the influential Master's of Arts and Certification (MAC) Program  that pioneered the teacher training residency and full-year internship model in the early 1990s. Additionally, Goodman's work was foundational in the creation of the ERIC educational database and was the foundation of the Interactive Communications & Simulations (ICS) Projects at UM as well as the non-profit Community System's Foundation. Goodman's research was deeply inspired by the work of the American Educational Philosopher John Dewey, constructivism, and pragmatism (as exemplified by Richard Rorty). Goodman specializes in experiential education, game design, authentic assessment and entrepreneurial education. Because he works to embody Dewey's idea that "experience is education" he did not emphasize publications but instead focused on doing and being in collaboration with others in service of learning.

Notably, Goodman was the creator of David Letterman's first (unsold) TV pilot, a gameshow called Decisions, Decisions. He also traveled South America with Ivan Illich and is thanked at the beginning of Illich's most famous book on education Deschooling Society.

References

American educational theorists
University of Michigan faculty
Living people
Year of birth missing (living people)